Benjamin Wentworth Munro Mike (born 24 August 1998) is an English cricketer. He made his List A debut for Leicestershire against India A in a tri-series warm-up match on 19 June 2018. He made his first-class debut for Leicestershire in the 2018 County Championship on 4 September 2018. He made his Twenty20 debut on 1 May 2019, for Leicestershire against the touring Pakistan team.

References

External links
 

1998 births
Living people
English cricketers
Leicestershire cricketers
Place of birth missing (living people)
Cricketers from Nottingham
English cricketers of the 21st century